The Portuguese Albums Chart ranks the best-performing albums in Portugal, as tracked by the Associação Fonográfica Portuguesa.

References 

Portugal
2013 in Portugal
Albums 2013